Persekama is short for Persatuan Sepakbola Kabupaten Madiun (en: Football Association of Madiun Regency). Persekama Madiun is an Indonesian football club based in Madiun Regency, East Java. The team plays in Liga 3.

References

External links
Liga-Indonesia.co.id
 

Football clubs in Indonesia
Football clubs in East Java
Association football clubs established in 1997
1997 establishments in Indonesia